Kennedy's Children is a 1973 play written by Robert Patrick. It originally opened on Broadway on November 3, 1975, and closed on January 4, 1976.

Synopsis
Five people in a dive bar in the Lower East Side all contemplate their life ten years after John F. Kennedy's assassination.

Background
The soldier character, Mark, was written originally by Patrick for his Off-Broadway play in 1970 "A Bad Place to Get Your Head". 

For the original cast, Mary Woronov was originally wanted for Carla. They begged Lily Tomlin to play Rona, and later asked Shirley MacLaine to play Carla, who after seeing the show, approached Patrick in the lobby, shook him, and said "Why didn't you make me play Carla?". Julie Newmar, who stated "only I am Carla", tried to pull him out of cab to convince him, but his boyfriend at the time won the tug-of-war.

Patrick stated he regretted the casting of the replacement company, they hired Shelley Winters for the Chicago cast only, and she stated she didn't have to learn lines just improvise.

Productions
Originally it premiered Off Off Broadway at the Clark Center for Performing Arts in 1973, starred Don Parker, and ran for three hours and forty minutes. With no producer, it wasn't staged fully for another year in 1974 in London's, King's Head Theatre, with Parker portraying Spranger and directed by Clive Donner. It premiered on October 30, 1974, and eventually transferred to Arts Theatre, becoming the first "fringe" play to transfer to the West End.

It premiered on November 3, 1975 at the John Golden Theatre. It was directed by Clive Donner, design Santo Loquasto, and lighting design Martin Aronstein. The cast were Barbara Montgomery (Wanda), Douglas Travis (Bartender), Don Parker (Spranger), Michael Sacks (Mark), Kaiulani Lee (Rona), and Shirley Knight (Carla).

It was later made into a TV film in 1982, with Merrill Brockway & Marshall W. Mason directing, starring Jane Alexander (Wanda), Lindsay Crouse (Rona), Brad Dourif (Mark), Charles Harper (Sparger), and Shirley Knight (Carla).

Awards and nominations

Original Broadway production

References

External links
Kennedy's Children at the Internet Broadway database
 

1973 plays
American plays adapted into films
Broadway plays
Off-Broadway plays
Plays set in New York City
Plays set in the 1970s
West End plays
Works about the assassination of John F. Kennedy